Paul Aerts (born 16 December 1949) is a Belgian racing cyclist. He rode in the 1972 Tour de France.

References

1949 births
Living people
Belgian male cyclists